Sidney James Parker (born 15 September 1930) is a former New Democratic Party member of the House of Commons of Canada. Before his political career, he was a train conductor.

He represented the British Columbia riding of Kootenay East, which in some elections was known as Kootenay East—Revelstoke. His first campaign against Stan Graham of the Progressive Conservative party in the 1979 federal election was unsuccessful. Parker won alternate terms in Parliament against Graham, first gaining the seat in 1980 election, losing in 1984, then returning to Parliament in the 1988 election.

Parker was defeated in the 1993 election by Jim Abbott of the Reform party. Stan Graham was not a competing candidate on this occasion. Parker left national politics after serving in the 32nd and 34th Canadian Parliaments.

External links
 

1930 births
Living people
Members of the House of Commons of Canada from British Columbia
New Democratic Party MPs
People from Revelstoke, British Columbia